Thor Island may refer to:

 Thor Island (Antarctica)
 Thor Island (Nunavut)